Zdeňka Veřmiřovská (June 27, 1913, Kopřivnice, Moravia – May 13, 1997) was a Czechoslovak/Czech gymnast who competed in the 1936 Summer Olympics receiving silver in the team event, and in the 1948 Summer Olympics winning gold in the team event.

She was born in Kopřivnice and died in Prague.

Vermirovska was a long-time mainstay of the Czechoslovakian women's gymnastics team, helping her team to gold at the inaugural World Championships for women in 1934, and showing enough tenacity to persevere and help her team to gold again at the 1948 London Summer Olympics, despite weathering the disappointment she and her teammates sustained when they lost the team title to the German team at the 1936 Berlin Summer Olympics.

Vermirovska was an exceptionally good competitor on balance beam.  At the 1936 Summer Olympics, she logged the competition's second-highest optional balance beam exercise score of 14.10, tied only with Germany's Erna Bürger, and behind top-scorer Gabriella Mészáros of Hungary, and her combined compulsory and optional exercise total of 23.10 on this apparatus was second outright, behind, again, only Mészáros.  At the 1948 Summer Olympics, she performed even more brilliantly in her voluntary exercise on this apparatus, garnering a first-place finish for that part of the competition.

She achieved what was probably her greatest individual accolade in her competitive career at the 1938 World Artistic Gymnastics Championships where she won Silver medals in both the All-Around and Floor Exercise.

External links
 profile
 Official Olympic Report 1936
 Official Olympic Report 1948
 

1913 births
1997 deaths
People from Kopřivnice
Czechoslovak female artistic gymnasts
Olympic gymnasts of Czechoslovakia
Gymnasts at the 1936 Summer Olympics
Gymnasts at the 1948 Summer Olympics
Olympic gold medalists for Czechoslovakia
Olympic silver medalists for Czechoslovakia
Olympic medalists in gymnastics
Medalists at the 1948 Summer Olympics
Medalists at the 1936 Summer Olympics
Medalists at the World Artistic Gymnastics Championships
Sportspeople from the Moravian-Silesian Region